Won Chang-yong (born 10 February 1973) is a South Korean former cyclist. He competed in the team pursuit at the 1992 Summer Olympics.

References

External links
 

1973 births
Living people
South Korean male cyclists
Olympic cyclists of South Korea
Cyclists at the 1992 Summer Olympics
Place of birth missing (living people)
Asian Games medalists in cycling
Asian Games bronze medalists for South Korea
Cyclists at the 1994 Asian Games
Medalists at the 1994 Asian Games